Nawabzada Syed Shams Haider (born December 23, 1957) is a Pakistani politician of the Pakistan Muslim League (N). He is a former member of the Provincial Assembly of the Punjab from Jhelum. He is the son of Nawabzada Syed Maqbool Ahmed. He comes of a prominent religious-cum-political family of the Punjab . His grandfather Nawab Sir Syed Mehr Shah and his granduncle Raja Ghazanfar Ali Khan had been Members of the Punjab Assembly; his close relatives have also been serving in the National as well as the Provincial Legislatures. He served as Member, District Council Jhelum for seven years. He remained Member, Provincial Assembly of the  during 1993-96 and 1997–99; and also functioned as Parliamentary Secretary for Health during 1997–99. He has returned to the Punjab Assembly for the third term in general elections 2008.

References

External links
Punjab Assembly Member Profile

1957 births
Living people
Ohio University alumni
Pakistan Muslim League (N) politicians
People from Lahore
People from Jhelum
Punjab MPAs 1993–1996
Punjab MPAs 1997–1999
People from Pind Dadan Khan
Politicians from Jhelum
Forman Christian College alumni